The Municipality of Nogales is a municipality of northern Sonora state, in Northwestern Mexico.

Geography
The northern boundary of the Municipality is located along the U.S.—Mexico border.

The county seat of the Municipality is the City of Nogales.  The city is abutted on its north by the city of Nogales, Arizona, United States.

History
The independent Nogales Municipality, which included the town of Nogales, was established on July 11, 1884. The Nogales Municipality covers an area of 1,675 km². Nogales was declared a city within the Municipality on January 1, 1920.

Escobarista Rebellion
Early in March 1929, the Escobarista Rebellion exploded in Nogales, sponsored by Obregonistas, supporters of Mexican president Álvaro Obregón, who had been assassinated on July 17, 1928. General Manuel Aguirre, commanding the rebellious 64th Regiment, took power without firing a shot, causing federales from Naco to send a daily airplane to attack the rebels. It dropped a few bombs over Nogales without doing any damage, while the rebels fought back with machine guns from the roofs without doing any damage to the airplane. There was only one casualty, a woman who was scared by a bomb explosion and had a heart attack. That same month, a hooded man appeared at night driving a tank on Morley Street on the U.S. side, then entered Mexico to help the federales in Naco. It seems that the tank had been bought in 1927 for fighting the Yaquis, but U.S. officials prohibited it from leaving the U.S., and it had been kept in a warehouse in Nogales, Arizona.

Government
The Nogales Municipality was governed by the Institutional Revolutionary Party (PRI) since 1931 
until the 2006 elections, when power shifted to the National Action Party (PAN).

The body of Cecilia Yépiz Reyna, former Secretary of Urban Development and Ecology, was found in a shallow grave near the border on March 6, 2021, after a three-month search. Her brother accused municipal president Jesús Pujol Irastorza, of the kidnapping and murder.

Municipal presidents

Assassination of a former Nogales official 
On 5 January 2021, civil engineer Cecilia Yépiz Reyna, former secretary of Infrastructure, Urban Development and Ecology of the City of Nogales, disappeared. Later, on 7 March, her body was found: Yépiz had been clandestinely buried in a grave located on a site located 1.86 miles (3 kilometers) Southwest of the Mexico International Highway 15, kilometer 249 of the Nogales-Ímuris section.   On 18 May, 2021, the alleged perpetrator, Fernando "N", was arrested in the city of San Luis Potosí transferred first to Hermosillo, and then to Nogales.

Population
The 2005 census the official population of the Nogales Municipality was 193,517. At the latest census in 2010, the official numbers were  220,292 for the Municipality.

The city and the municipality both rank third in the state in population, after Hermosillo and Ciudad Obregón. The municipality includes many outlying but small rural communities. The only other localities with over 1,000 inhabitants are La Mesa (2,996)  and Centro de Readaptación Social Nuevo (2,203) . Nogales is served by Nogales International Airport.

The population growth is in part due to the influx of industry that has come since the opening of the maquiladora industry through the National Industrialization Program, decades before the North American Free Trade Agreement (NAFTA). Manufacturing now accounts for 55% of the city's gross domestic product, and services are growing as well, most of this caused by the growing jobs in the city.

Nogales is known for its recent enormous population growth which covers the hills along the central narrow north-south valley. Dispersed among the houses, the visitor will find a mixture of factories, stores, etc. In 2006, the southern half of the city experienced a modern urbanization development including shopping malls, wide avenues, and modern housing conglomerations.

Economy
The primary commercial artery is Mexico Federal Highway 15, which links the state with the U.S. as well as major cities in Mexico.

Tourism
Due to its location, Nogales is one of the most important ports of entry for the U.S.  The downtown area used to have a large number of bars, strip clubs, hotels, restaurants, as well as  curio stores, which sold a large variety of artesanias (handicrafts, leather art, handmade flowers, clothes) brought from the deeper central and southern states of Mexico. However, now downtown Nogales has forgotten those activities, due to two main causes: the recent violence in Mexico, and the barriers imposed by the US Government after September 11, 2001.

Manufacturing
Maquiladoras, or manufacturing plants, employ a large percentage of the population. Nogales' proximity to the U.S. and the abundance of inexpensive labor make it an efficient location for foreign companies to have manufacturing and assembly operations. Some of the companies that have established maquiladoras in Nogales include: Otis Elevator, The Chamberlain Group, Walbro, and  Philips Avent.

Production and export
Approximately 92 establishments produce foreign exports. Sixty-five of these establishments are located in seven industrial parks, which employ approximately 25,400 workers, around 50 percent of the total employed population of the municipality.  Also important to the economy is livestock for both foreign export and cattle breeding.

See also
City of Nogales, Sonora
Municipalities of Sonora

References

Link to tables of population data from Census of 2005 INEGI: Instituto Nacional de Estadística, Geografía e Informática

External links
Nogales, Ayuntamiento Digital (Official Website of Nogales, Sonora)  
Everything you want to know about Nogales - Bilingual

Municipalities of Sonora